Nealmont is an unincorporated community and census-designated place (CDP) in Blair County, Pennsylvania, United States. It was first listed as a CDP prior to the 2020 census.

The CDP is in northeastern Blair County, in the southeastern corner of Snyder Township. It sits on the north side of the Little Juniata River, where it emerges from its water gap between Bald Eagle Mountain to the north and Brush Mountain to the south. Pennsylvania Route 550 runs along the northern side of the CDP, leading west through the water gap  to Tyrone and northeast  to State College.

Demographics

References 

Census-designated places in Blair County, Pennsylvania
Census-designated places in Pennsylvania